The Ingleby Company or Ingleby Farms & Forests is a worldwide farming corporation. It is owned by the British-based Swedish Rausing family. It owns significant farming interests in New Zealand, Romania, Argentina, Latvia, Lithuania, the United States and Australia. It is based in Denmark.

Australia
Ingleby operates under a variety of subsidiaries in Australia. In 2005 it purchased the 1838 property Bowood for AUD$7.75 million and in 2011 purchased the 1839 Georgian Symmons Plains Estate from the Youl family for AUD$10 million.

New Zealand
The company operates as Ingleby Company Ltd in New Zealand. It has purchased 17 farming properties, of which it later sold one, merged two and sold part of another. They received heavy criticism for allegedly overpaying for properties to cut locals out of the market, particularly in their NZ$4.2 million purchase of Katoa Station, Gisborne District, in 2007. They own an estimated  in New Zealand. It is the largest foreigner owner of pastoral land in New Zealand.

Romania
Ingleby Agricultura/Ingleby Farms & Forests are the primary subsidiaries of Ingleby in Romania.

References

Agriculture companies of Denmark
Companies based in Stevns Municipality